The Australian cricket team in England in 1980 played 5 first-class matches including the Centenary Test to mark 100 years of Test cricket in England.  It was during the Centenary Test that John Arlott gave his last commentary for the BBC's Test Match Special.

Australian Squad
The Australian squad selected for the tour by Sam Loxton, Alan Davidson, Phil Ridings and Ray Lindwall was as follows:
Batsmen – Greg Chappell (captain), Kim Hughes (vice captain), Allan Border, Graeme Wood, Bruce Laird, John Dyson, Graham Yallop (back up wicketkeeper)
Fast bowlers – Dennis Lillee, Len Pascoe, Jeff Thomson, Geoff Dymock
Spinners – Ray Bright, Ashley Mallett,
Wicketkeeper – Rod Marsh
Peter Toohey, Julien Wiener and Rick McCosker were considered unlucky to miss selection. Jim Higgs declared himself unable to tour.

One Day Internationals (ODIs)

England won the Prudential Trophy 2–0.

1st ODI

2nd ODI

Test match summary

References

External sources
 CricketArchive itinerary

Annual reviews
 Playfair Cricket Annual 1981
 Wisden Cricketers' Almanack 1981

1980 in Australian cricket
1980 in English cricket
International cricket competitions from 1975–76 to 1980
1980